99 Cent is a colour photograph by German photographer Andreas Gursky, created in 1999. It depicts a view of the interior of a 99 cent store in Los Angeles. It was created with the use of digital manipulation, like the artist does for his work since 1990. The photograph was included by Time magazine in the list of the 100 most important photographs ever taken in 1999. Gursky made a new version of this photograph, 99 Cent II Diptychon, in 2001, which would be one of the most expensive ever sold.

History and description
Gursky explained that he was inspired to create this photograph one day while driving in Los Angeles, on his first time there, when he became fascinated by a similar store window. The current photograph depicts several shelves of consuming goods aligned in a row, all with the same price, including recognizable brands of chocolates, beverages, peanut butter and tooth paste. The result is a large colourful composition, where six white poles standout and conduct the viewers gaze to the posters that advertise the brand of supermarkets at the wall of the background. Some people are also visible in the composition. The official website of The Broad states that "The spectacle of consumerism appears composed in an organized, rigorous, formal fashion. The presented image is hyperreal. While it is rooted in reality, it is somehow more than real; it is familiar and yet there is no physical space quite like it. By portraying such heightened constructions of our shared existence — from the dollar store to the soccer field to the sprawling cityscape — Gursky’s photographs act as symbols of contemporary life."

Sophie Duplaix stated that "The succession of shelves, like a wave, gives a dizzying dimension to the image, which is reinforced by the reflection on the ceiling of the displays. It is in a second phase that the figures of the customers of the store emerge, which the profusion of packaging seemed to have swallowed up. We can read here all the ambiguity of the presence of man in Gursky, a presence which, when it is not as a crowd, multitude or gathering, the subject of the work – where it is just as instrumentalized –, serves as an indicator of scale rather than as a support for a narration."

Art market
A print of this photograph sold by $2,256,000 on 6 May 2006, at Sotheby's New York.

Public collections
There are prints of the photograph at the San Francisco Museum of Modern Art, at The Broad, in Los Angeles, the Museum of Contemporary Art, in Los Angeles, and at the Musée National d'Art Moderne, in Paris.

See also
 List of most expensive photographs

References

1990s photographs
1999 in art
Color photographs
Photographs by Andreas Gursky
Photographs in the collection of the Musée National d'Art Moderne
Collection of The Broad
Photographs of the San Francisco Museum of Modern Art